Elections were held on November 14, 1994 in the Regional Municipality of Ottawa-Carleton. This page lists the election results for Regional Chair, Regional Council, and local mayors and councils of the RMOC in 1994. The 1994 election was the first election for a separate regional council.

Results were as follows:

Regional Chair of Ottawa-Carleton

Regional Council

Cumberland
Mayoral race

Council

Gloucester
Mayoral race

Council

Goulbourn
Mayoral race

Council

Kanata
Mayoral race

Council

Nepean
Mayoral race

Council

Osgoode
Mayoral race

Council
Four elected at large. Elected councillors indicated in bold.

Ottawa

Mayoral race

Rideau
Mayoral race

Council

Rockcliffe Park
Mayoral race

Council
Four elected at large. Elected councillors indicated in bold.

Vanier
Mayoral race

Council

West Carleton
Mayoral race

Council

References

Sources

Municipal elections in Ottawa
1994 Ontario municipal elections